William Van Winkle "Jimmy" Wolf (May 12, 1862 – May 16, 1903), also known as Chicken Wolf, was an American professional baseball player from Louisville, Kentucky. He played all or part of eleven seasons in Major League Baseball. He was primarily a right fielder, but occasionally played other positions in the infield.

Wolf played for his hometown team, the Louisville Colonels of the American Association, from 1882, when they were called the Eclipse, to 1891.  He was the only player to appear in that league in all ten seasons of its existence.  He set a number of career American Association records: most games, most plate appearances, most hits, most triples, most total bases.

When the American Association folded, he then played for the St. Louis Browns of the National League in 1892, his last season in the majors. He played in just three games for the Browns before being let go. He played in the minor leagues until 1894 before retiring.

Apart from his playing exploits, Wolf is well-known for an incident that took place on August 22nd, 1886 when he hit an inside-the-park, walkoff home run against the Cincinnati Red Stockings. The Reds' outfielder Abner Powell might have been better-placed to prevent the run had he not been impeded by an angry dog who had been sleeping next to the fence.

In 1889, with the team 2–8 after ten games under player-manager Dude Esterbrook, the managerial reins were handed over to Wolf, who won only 14 of the 65 games he managed. The other two managers to follow, Dan Shannon and Jack Chapman, didn't fare any better, as Louisville won only 27 games that year with 111 losses. In 1890, he led the American Association in batting with .363.

Wolf died in 1903 at the age of 41, from the effects of brain trauma he suffered a few years before in a fire-fighting accident, and is interred at Cave Hill Cemetery in Louisville. This cemetery is where other Louisville ballplayers have been buried as well, including childhood friend and teammate Pete Browning.

See also
 List of Major League Baseball career stolen bases leaders
 List of Major League Baseball career triples leaders
 List of Major League Baseball player-managers

References

External links

SABR Biography "Chicken Wolf"

Major League Baseball right fielders
Louisville Eclipse players
Louisville Colonels players
St. Louis Browns (NL) players
Louisville Colonels managers
Syracuse Stars (minor league baseball) players
Utica Stars players
Buffalo Bisons (minor league) players
Savannah Modocs players
Macon Hornets players
Major League Baseball player-managers
Baseball players from Louisville, Kentucky
19th-century baseball players
Burials at Cave Hill Cemetery
1862 births
1903 deaths